James Halligan may refer to:

 James Halligan (1778–1806), Irishman hanged for murder
 James Halligan (American football) (1879–1965), American football coach
 Jim Halligan (born 1936), American politician
 James Reginald Halligan (1894–1968), Australian public servant

See also
 Halligan (surname)